In mathematics, a biorthogonal system is a pair of indexed families of vectors

such that

An example is the pair of sets of respectively left and right eigenvectors of a matrix, indexed by eigenvalue, if the eigenvalues are distinct.

Projection

Related to a biorthogonal system is the projection 

Construction

Given a possibly non-orthogonal set of vectors  and  the projection related is 

where  is the matrix with entries  
  and  then is a biorthogonal system.

See also

References

 Jean Dieudonné, On biorthogonal systems Michigan Math. J.  2 (1953), no. 1, 7–20  

Topological vector spaces